The Salinas Valley Tribune is a weekly paid newspaper which serves the California cities of Gonzales, Soledad, Greenfield, Salinas and surrounding Monterey County in the Salinas Valley. At one time the largest circulating paper in the county, its current circulation is 2,650. It is part of New SV Media, which also publishes the King City Rustler and Hollister Free Lance. 

It is edited by Ryan Cronk.

 History 
The newspaper was founded on January 24, 1891 by Thomas Renison as an independent weekly.  Renison had immigrated from Ireland at the age of 18, settling in the Bay Area in 1868. While living in Gonzales he established the Gonzales Tribune'', publishing its first volume on January 24, 1891.  He served as a presidential elector with the Democratic State Central Committee, resigning in 1892. Renison would run it for only a few years; while editing it he was studying law, and in 1894, after passing the bar, he announced that he was moving to Salinas, California, where he established a law practice, served several terms as mayor and was elected to state assembly.

By 1893, the Gonzales Tribune had become the largest newspaper in the county, a title it would only hold for a short time.

For some time it was edited by H. R. Farley. Around Halloween of 1898, Farley began to write a series of articles in the paper attacking the current Monterey County Sheriff, who had been accused of using names on local tombstones to embezzle county funds intended to feed and clothe prisoners.  The articles hurt the reputation of the Sheriff, and Farley put himself up as challenger in the next election, using the paper as a campaign vehicle, and winning in a heated contest. Farley's ascension into the position of Sheriff, however, would be his end; less than a year into his term his attempted apprehension of a drunken resident led to his murder.

The Gonzales Tribune was sold, along with other South County Newspapers products, in 1995 to Rochelle, Illinois-based News Media Corporation.

On July 1, 2019, California publisher New SV Media Inc. purchased the Tribune, ending several decades of out-of-state ownership.

On April 1, 2020, it was renamed the Salinas Valley Tribune. The new logo had been in development before the COVID-19 pandemic hit and the timing of the announcement was coincidental, publisher Jeanie Johnson said.

References

Weekly newspapers published in California
Monterey County, California